Oreilles d'âne ('donkey's ears') is a traditional recipe of the Valgaudemar and Champsaur valleys and the region around La Salette-Fallavaux in the French Alps. It's a gratin casserole of wild spinach and either lasagna or crêpes.

Name
The dish acquires its name from its key ingredient of wild spinach, which at maturity have leaves likened in shape to a donkey's ear.

Traditional recipe
The tradition recipe was to use small round pastas cut into pieces, which were poached in salted water, layered in a gratin alternating with spinach leaves cooked au jus, béchamel sauce and grated tomme, and baked.

In the village of La Salette-Fallavaux, oreilles d'âne were made of large ravioli garnished with chard or poached spinach, topped with béchamel sauce and au gratin.

Modern recipe

References

See also 
 Tourton

French cuisine
Hautes-Alpes
Alpes-de-Haute-Provence